Carolyn Shelby is an American micronationalist who currently reigns as the Queen and head of state of the Royal Republic of Ladonia. She has been reigning since June 2, 2011, succeeding Ywonne I Jarl as the head of state after being elected by the Cabinet of Ministers of Ladonia.

Personal life
Carolyn was born in the United States in 1976. According to the official website of Ladonia, she has 3 children and continues to live in the United States.

Ladonia

Carolyn has served as Carolyn I of the micronation of Ladonia since June 2, 2011, and was crowned on September 19, 2011, at Nimis in Ladonia. Her role makes her the head of state of the micronation. According to the official website of Ladonia, her duties are to represent Ladonia as a constitutional monarch and exercises full power of the micronation alongside the Cabinet of Ministers.

See also
Ladonia (micronation)
Micronation

References

External links
 Official website of Ladonia
 Queen of Ladonia

Living people
Micronational leaders
Place of birth missing (living people)
Self-proclaimed monarchy
Year of birth missing (living people)